Prague 21, also known as Újezd nad Lesy is municipal district (městská část) in Prague, Czech Republic. It is located in the eastern part of the city. It has 9,209 inhabitants.

The administrative district (správní obvod) of the same name consists of municipal district Prague 21, Běchovice, Klánovice and Koloděje.

External links 
 Prague 21 - Official homepage

Districts of Prague